Bad Parents is a 2012 comedy film written and directed by Caytha Jentis and starring Janeane Garofalo. The movie humorously showcases New Jersey soccer moms becoming obsessed with their children's role in the sport. The supporting cast features Christopher Titus and Cheri Oteri.

Cast
 Janeane Garofalo as Kathy
 Christopher Titus as Nick
 Michael Boatman as Gary
 Reiko Aylesworth as Laurie 
 Cheri Oteri as Melissa
 Kristen Johnston as Tracy
 Rebecca Budig as Allison
 Lauren Francesca as Candy
 Hannah Thompson as Olivia

Production
The film was shot entirely in New Jersey and used local Morris County talent. Jentis based the film on her own experiences.

Release
Bad Parents premiered on October 3, 2012, at the Montclair Film Festival and later played at Ridgewood, New Jersey, on February 23, 2014.

External links

References 

2012 films
2012 black comedy films
American black comedy films
American association football films
Films set in New Jersey
Films shot in New Jersey
2010s English-language films
2010s American films